CyberTracker is a 1994 American science fiction action film written by Jacobsen Hart and directed by Richard Pepin. It stars Don 'The Dragon' Wilson with Richard Norton, Stacie Foster, Steve Burton, Abby Dalton and Jim Maniaci.

The film was followed by a 1995 direct-to-video sequel, CyberTracker 2, also starring Wilson, Foster, Burton and Maniaci.

Plot synopsis
In the future, Eric Anthony Phillips is the head of the Secret Service detachment assigned to protect Senator Bob Dilly (John Aprea). Senator Dilly is a champion of the recently implemented Computerized Judicial System (Computerized Justice for short), a product of Cybercore Industry, that uses data as evidence to determine the guilt of accused criminals, then carries out the sentence using cyborg executioners called "Trackers" (Maniaci).

However, the more Phillips learns about Dilly and the Cybercore's ruthless plans, the more uncomfortable he becomes and he refuses to go along with the murder of a corporate spy. This leads Dilly and Cybercore to frame Phillips with the murder as they activate a Tracker to execute him. Phillips defeats the Tracker but is taken by a group of underground rebels called the Union for Human Rights (UHR). The group is secretly led by popular news journalist Connie Griffith (Foster).

While being tracked by another Tracker and Dilly's head bodyguard (Norton), Phillips and Connie are able to break into Cybercore and steal secret files revealing that Sen. Dilly is in fact a cyborg. Phillips defeats the bodyguard and yet a third Tracker and then infiltrates a press conference to shoot Dilly, publicly revealing his mechanical nature. This, along with everything else UHR has discovered, causes the Computerized Judicial System to be shut down and Cybercore to collapse.

Cast

 Don "The Dragon" Wilson as Eric Phillips
 Richard Norton as Ross
 Stacie Foster as Connie
 Joseph Ruskin as "Rounds"
 John Aprea as Senator Bob Dilly
 Abby Dalton as Chief Olson
 Steve Burton as Jared
 David Barnathan as Marcus
 Edward Blanchard as Gil
 Lisa Larosa as Ally
 Christina Zilber as Kate (credited as Christina Naify)
 Duchess Dale as Becca
 G. William Keith as Moderator
 Peter Kluge as Reporter
 Dana Sparks as Stephanie
 Kevin Carr as Cooley
 Joel Weiss as Grubb
 Thomas Rosales Jr. as Man With Gun In Club (uncredited)
 Jim Maniaci as The Trackers

Production 
Production company PM Entertainment said that by the 1990s, action film fans were demanding higher budgets from independent films.  To compensate, the company hired less expensive talent to star in them.  PM Entertainment budgeted these films at $1.5–5 million.

Reception 
TV Guide rated it 2/4 stars and called it a Terminator knock-off with a better script than the typical low budget action film.  In his science fiction film guide Outer Limits, author Howard Hughes wrote that the film has "some impressive explosions and car crashes", but the sets look "suspiciously like 1990s Los Angeles". The film was briefly touched upon by Red Letter Media on an episode of "Best of the Worst" where they referred to the movie as being so unremarkable and boring that they didn't even want to review it.

The film was mocked by Rifftrax as a VOD release in 2016.

References

External links

1994 films
1990s science fiction action films
American science fiction action films
Cyberpunk films
Cyborg films
Films set in the 2010s
Android (robot) films
Films directed by Richard Pepin
1990s English-language films
1990s American films